As-Sulṭaan al-Ghaazee Muhammad Thakurufaanu al-A'uẓam (death 26 August 1585) or As-Sultan Ghazi Muhammad Bodu Thakurufaanu ruled over the Maldive Islands from 1573 to 1585. He is known for fighting the Portuguese who ruled over the Maldives from 1558–1573 after killing Sultan Ali VI in Malé. His victory is commemorated in the Maldives as Qaumee Dhuvas or National Day.

Early years
Muhammad Thakurufaanu was the son of Katheebu Hussain  of Utheemu in Thiladhummathi Atoll and Lady Aiminaa Dhiyoa of Ihavandhoo. Muhammad Thakurufan learned  (Martial Arts).

Defeat of the Portuguese

After the invasion, the Portuguese ruled over the Maldives in a period which the history describes as 
A time when intolerable enormities were committed by the invading infidels, a time when the sea grew red with Maldivian blood, a time when people were sunk in despair

To bring an end to this, Muhammad Thakurufaanu, left the Maldives with his brothers Ali and Hasan to Minicoy] off the coast of India in the Laccadive Archipelago. The three Utheemu brothers built the ship . It is said that Muhammad Thakurufaanu received a help from the Maroshi  (toddy-tapper) who mended and maintained the sail of the  - the ship used in the battle and supply water to the vessel every time it docked at Maroshi. It is also the largest tree of its kind in the country.
Kalhuoffumi is currently dismantled, and turned into a mosqué in Kolhufushi

The brothers landed on a different island every night, fought the Portuguese and set sail into the ocean before daybreak. The Utheemu brothers along with other Maldivians, fought and killed the Portuguese garrison and regained independence for the country.  was killed by a musket shot of Muhammad Thakurufaanu.

Aftermath

After killing , as per a treaty he got refuge from Ali Raja of Cannanore, India. Muhammad Thakurufaanu's base of operation was Maliku under the sovereignty of Cannanore. The Ali Raja demanded dominion over the Maldives, as promised to him by the Muhammad Thakurufaanu. The nature of the relationship between Muhammad Thakurufan and Ali Raja of Cannanore was outlined in a letter sent by a later Ali Raja, Mariambe Ali-Adi Raja Bibi, to the Sultan Muhammad Mueenuddine I of the Maldives. The letter was dated Friday 17 Jumad al-Awla Anno Hegirae 1243 (7 December AD 1827). According to the letter Muhammad Thakurufan had entered into a treaty ceding sovereignty of the Maldives to the Ali Raja of Cannanore in the event Thakurufan was established in power in Male.

Muhammad Thakurufaanu concluded a treaty with the King Dom Manoel who lived in Goa, in order to ward off the Ali Raja of Cannanore. Although Muhammad Thakurufan was made a regent of King Dom Manoel (as per the treaty), the Maldivians assigned  Muhammad Thakurufaanu as the Sultan of the Maldives, no longer recognizing the sovereignty of the self-exiled Christian kings in Goa or their regents. The chronicles report him to have ruled wisely, being just and considerate, protecting all the poor, and even solicitous for the people’s interests. Muhammed Thakurufaanu died a natural death on 26 August 1585.

Death

As-Sultan Muhammad Thakurufaanu al-Auzam died on 1st Ramadan 993 AH, after 11 years and 6 months in power. It was on 18 August 1585. He was buried on the Mausoleum of the Muhammad Thakurufaanu al-Auzam near Bihuroazu Kamanaa Mosque in Malé.

Legacy

British author Royston Ellis's  novel A Hero in Time is about the life and adventures of Muhammad Thakurufaanu.

The army (lashkaru) organised by him has evolved into the Maldives National Defence Force.

The Islamic Centre, the largest mosque in Maldives, Masjid as-Sultan Muhammad Thakurufaanu al-Auzam is named after him.

See also
List of Sultans of the Maldives
Islamic Centre (Maldives)
Qaumee Dhuvas
Origin of the Security Force in Maldives
Bihuroazu Kamanaa Mosque

References

Divehi Tārīkhah Au Alikameh. Divehi Bahāi Tārikhah Khidmaiykurā Qaumī Markazu. Reprint 1958 edn. Male’ 1990.
H.C.P. Bell, The Maldive Islands, An account of the physical features, History, Inhabitants, Productions and Trade. Colombo 1883, 

1535 births
1585 deaths
16th-century sultans of the Maldives
Conflicts in 1573
Wars involving the Maldives
Year of birth unknown